Fever Pitch Soccer, known as Head-On Soccer in North America, is a soccer video game originally developed and published by U.S. Gold for the Sega Genesis/Mega Drive in 1995.

Featuring an arcade-style approach to soccer compared to other titles that were released at the time, Fever Pitch Soccer allows players to have the choice of playing across any of the game modes available against with either CPU-controlled opponents or other players with the team of their choosing. Initially launched for the Genesis, it was then released on the Super Nintendo Entertainment System a few months after the original version and was later ported to the Atari Jaguar in December of the same year.

Fever Pitch Soccer received generally positive reception from critics since its release on the Genesis/Mega Drive, with praise towards the graphics, sound, gameplay and the ability to upgrade the various abilities of the team players upon winning matches. The Super NES version also received positive reception, with praise to the improved graphics and sound from the Genesis original while the Jaguar version, though criticized for not taking advantage of the hardware, was generally well-received and considered by some reviewers as one of the better titles for the system. Critics, however, compared the game with both the FIFA series from Electronic Arts and the original International Superstar Soccer from Konami.

Gameplay 

Fever Pitch Soccer is a soccer game that is played from an isometric perspective in a two-dimensional environment with sprites. Although it follows the same gameplay as with other soccer titles at the time and most of the sport's rules are present as well, the game opts for a more arcade-styled and slapstick approach of the sport, instead of being a full simulation, as the team players tends to have a lean towards "dirty" play, in addition of having their respective special abilities such as the ability to dive in an attempt to win a free-kick or penalty and as the player's team wins games, they gain access to additional team players. There are also multiple stadiums to choose from, each with their own characteristics.

With the exception of the Jaguar port, the Genesis and SNES versions feature support for multitap accessories, allowing more than two people for multiplayer. Every version also have five types of language settings to choose from at the main menu screen and a password system to resume progress.

Modes 
There are two main gameplay modes to pick at the menu: Tournament and Exhibition. Exhibition, as the name implies, is a non-competitive mode for two or more players, while Tournament is the main mode of the game, where players compete against computer-controlled teams and a password is given out following the successful completion of each game in this mode so that progress can be resumed at any given point.

Teams 
There are 51 teams available to choose from before the start of any mode, each one representing their country and having their own in-game behavior:

Development and release 
The Jaguar port was originally previewed in early 1995 by French magazine CD Consoles under the name Red Hot Soccer, featuring various differences compared to the final version, and was also showcased at Autumn ECTS '95. Atari Corporation UK marketing manager Darryl Still stated in a 2016 interview that the game was chosen to be ported for the Jaguar as part of Atari's European center of development, which was established in January of the same year with the aim of working alongside small game developers around the region to make titles for the system.

Fever Pitch Soccer was first released for the Sega Genesis/Mega Drive in North America and Europe in 1995 by U.S. Gold. This version was later published in Brazil by Tectoy, and in Australia by Sega under the Sega Sports label. It was then released for the Super Nintendo in Europe on August 1995 and a month later in North America. In Germany, the game is known as Mario Basler: Jetzt geht's los! on both the Genesis/Mega Drive and Super NES, due to being endorsed by the former German winger athlete Mario Basler. It was ported to the Atari Jaguar by Distinctive Developments and published by Atari Corporation in both North America and Europe on 15 December 1995, under the name Fever Pitch Soccer in both regions (previous North American releases of the game used the title Head-On Soccer). A version for the 32X was planned but never released.

Reception 

Reviewing the Super NES version, Next Generation said that the game has more strategy than the average soccer sim and is decently fun, especially when using a multitap. GamePro gave both the Genesis/Mega Drive and Super NES versions positive reviews. They commented that the unrealistic gameplay makes it more fast-paced and potentially more fun than other soccer simulations, and were especially pleased with the exaggerated soccer moves which would not be possible in real life. They also remarked that the graphics and sounds of the Genesis/Mega Drive version, while not as good as those of the Super NES version, were more than good enough. Their review of the later Jaguar version said that though it is a port of the Super NES version with no enhancements to make use of the next-generation hardware, "it's still fun". Next Generation also found the Jaguar version retained the fun of the game. The reviewer summarized, "Not exactly the game for soccer idealists, Fever Pitch Soccer is fun, but it's a little on the frivolous side." Next Generation reviewed the Genesis/Mega Drive version of the game, and stated that "Ultimately, Head On Soccer is easy to play and, unfortunately, it's just as easy to stop playing." In 1995, Total! ranked Fever Pitch Soccer 98th on their Top 100 SNES Games summarizing: "Not that accomplished as a full-on footy sim, but the comedy makes it that little bit different."

Notes

References

External links 
 Fever Pitch Soccer at GameFAQs
 Fever Pitch Soccer at Giant Bomb
 Fever Pitch Soccer at MobyGames
 Fever Pitch Soccer at AtariAge

1995 video games
Association football video games
Atari games
Atari Jaguar games
Cancelled Sega 32X games
Multiplayer and single-player video games
Sega Genesis games
Super Nintendo Entertainment System games
U.S. Gold games
Video games developed in the United Kingdom